This page lists the criteria used to determine the field for the 2020 U.S. Open at Winged Foot Golf Club, and the players who qualified.

Normally, about half the field at the U.S. Open gain entry via local and sectional qualifying. However, due to the COVID–19 pandemic, in 2020, the entire field consisted of players who were exempt from qualifying. The revised exemption criteria were announced on June 25. Existing exemptions were retained and the field was reduced from 156 down to 144. Among several changes to exemption criteria, additional places were awarded based on performances in tournaments on the PGA and European tours, and many other spots were filled from various ranking and money lists with cut-off dates nearer the rescheduled tournament dates.

Rule changes
The U.S. Amateur champion no longer forfeits his U.S. Open exemption if he turns professional.

Entrants by eligibility criteria
Each player is classified according to the first category in which he qualified, and other categories are shown in parentheses.

1. Previous winners of the U.S. Open
Winners of the U.S. Open during the previous ten years:

Dustin Johnson (11,15)
Martin Kaymer
Graeme McDowell (15)
Rory McIlroy (2,9,11,12,15)
Justin Rose (2,11,15)
Webb Simpson (9,11,12,15)
Jordan Spieth (6,8,15)
Gary Woodland (2,11,15)

Brooks Koepka (2,7,11,15) did not play.

2. Leading players from the previous U.S. Open
The top 10 and ties at the 2019 U.S. Open:

Chesson Hadley
Louis Oosthuizen (11,15)
Jon Rahm (11,15)
Chez Reavie (11,15)
Xander Schauffele (11,15)
Adam Scott (11,15)
Henrik Stenson (8,15)

3. Winner of the U.S. Senior Open in 2019
Winner of the 2019 U.S. Senior Open:

Steve Stricker

4. Winner of the U.S. Amateur in 2019
Winner of the 2019 U.S. Amateur:

Andy Ogletree (a)

5. Top finishers from USGA amateur tournaments in 2019
Winners of the 2019 U.S. Junior Amateur and 2019 U.S. Mid-Amateur; and runner-up at the 2019 U.S. Amateur:

John Augenstein (a)
Lukas Michel (a)
Preston Summerhays (a)

6. Recent winners of the Masters Tournament
Winners of the Masters Tournament from 2016 to 2019:

Sergio García (15)
Patrick Reed (11,12,15)
Danny Willett (10,15)
Tiger Woods (15)

7. Recent winners of the PGA Championship
Winners of the PGA Championship from 2015 to 2020:

Jason Day (15) 
Collin Morikawa (15)
Justin Thomas (11,12,15)
Jimmy Walker

8. Recent winners of The Open Championship
Winners of The Open Championship from 2015 to 2019:

Zach Johnson
Shane Lowry (15)

Francesco Molinari (15) did not play.

9. Recent winners of The Players Championship
Winners of The Players Championship from 2018 to 2020:

10. Winner of the BMW PGA Championship in 2019
Winner of the 2019 BMW PGA Championship:

11. Players who qualified for the Tour Championship in 2019
Players who qualified for the season-ending 2019 Tour Championship on the PGA Tour:

Abraham Ancer (15)
Patrick Cantlay (15)
Paul Casey (15)
Corey Conners (15)
Bryson DeChambeau (15)
Tony Finau (15)
Tommy Fleetwood (15)
Rickie Fowler (15)
Lucas Glover
Charles Howell III
Im Sung-jae (15)
Kevin Kisner (15)
Jason Kokrak
Matt Kuchar (15)
Marc Leishman (15)
Hideki Matsuyama (15)
Brandt Snedeker (15)

12. Winners of multiple events on the PGA Tour
Winners of multiple PGA Tour events that award a full-point allocation for the FedEx Cup, between the 2019 U.S. Open and the originally scheduled date of the 2020 U.S. Open:

13. Winner of The Amateur Championship in 2019
Winner of the 2019 Amateur Championship:
James Sugrue (a)

14. Winner of the Mark H. McCormack Medal in 2019
Winner of the 2019 Mark H. McCormack Medal (men's World Amateur Golf Ranking):

Cole Hammer (a)

15. Leading players from the Official World Golf Ranking
The top 70 points leaders and ties as of March 15 in the Official World Golf Ranking:

An Byeong-hun
Christiaan Bezuidenhout
Keegan Bradley
Rafa Cabrera-Bello
Joel Dahmen
Matt Fitzpatrick
Adam Hadwin
Tyrrell Hatton
Lucas Herbert
Billy Horschel
Viktor Hovland
Shugo Imahira
Jazz Janewattananond
Kang Sung-hoon
Chan Kim
Kurt Kitayama
Tom Lewis
Robert MacIntyre
Phil Mickelson
Kevin Na
Shaun Norris
Eddie Pepperell
Victor Perez
Ian Poulter
Andrew Putnam
Cameron Smith
Brendon Todd
Erik van Rooyen
Matt Wallace
Bubba Watson
Lee Westwood
Bernd Wiesberger

Scottie Scheffler withdrew after testing positive for COVID-19.

16. Leading finishers from designated tournaments in 2020

16a. The Memorial Tournament
The top two players, not otherwise exempt, in the top 10 and ties of the 2020 Memorial Tournament:

Mackenzie Hughes
Ryan Palmer

16b. 3M Open
The top two players, not otherwise exempt, in the top 10 and ties of the 2020 3M Open:

Adam Long
Michael Thompson

16c. WGC-FedEx St. Jude Invitational
The top two players, not otherwise exempt, in the top 10 and ties of the 2020 WGC-FedEx St. Jude Invitational:

Daniel Berger

16d. Barracuda Championship
The top two players, not otherwise exempt, in the top 10 and ties of the 2020 Barracuda Championship:

Troy Merritt
Richy Werenski

16e. PGA Championship
The top three players, not otherwise exempt, in the top 10 and ties of the 2020 PGA Championship:

Cameron Champ
Matthew Wolff

16f. Wyndham Championship
The top two players, not otherwise exempt, in the top 10 and ties of the 2020 Wyndham Championship:

Jim Herman
Kim Si-woo

17. Leading players from the FedEx Cup points standings
The top five players, not otherwise exempt, from the final 2019–20 FedEx Cup standings:

Tyler Duncan
Brian Harman
Mark Hubbard
Danny Lee
Sebastián Muñoz

18. Leading players from the European Tour's UK Swing
The top ten aggregate point earners, not otherwise exempt, in the five European Tour events from the Betfred British Masters through the ISPS Handa Wales Open:

Thomas Detry
Justin Harding
Rasmus Højgaard
Romain Langasque
Adrián Otaegui
Renato Paratore
Andy Sullivan
Connor Syme
Sami Välimäki

Sam Horsfield withdrew after testing positive for COVID-19.

19. Leading players from the Korn Ferry Tour regular season points standings
The top five players, not otherwise exempt, from the 2020 Korn Ferry Tour Regular Season Points List through the WinCo Foods Portland Open:

Paul Barjon
Lee Hodges
Taylor Pendrith
Davis Riley
Will Zalatoris

20. Leading players from the Korn Ferry Tour Championship Series
The top five aggregate point earners, not otherwise exempt, from the three Korn Ferry Tour events beginning with the Albertsons Boise Open through the Korn Ferry Tour Championship:

Stephan Jäger
Curtis Luck
Dan McCarthy
Greyson Sigg
Brandon Wu

21. Leading players from the Japan Golf Tour in 2019
The top two players, not otherwise exempt as of July 15, from the 2019 Japan Golf Tour Order of Merit:

Ryo IshikawaHwang Jung-gon did not play due to mandatory military service in South Korea.22. Leading player from the Sunshine Tour in 2019–20
The top player, not otherwise exempt as of July 15, from the 2019–20 Sunshine Tour Order of Merit:

J. C. Ritchie

23. Leading player from the Asian Tour in 2019
The top player, not otherwise exempt as of July 15, from the 2019 Asian Tour Order of Merit:

Scott Hend

24. Leading player from the PGA Tour of Australasia in 2019
The top player, not otherwise exempt as of July 15, from the 2019 PGA Tour of Australasia Order of Merit:

Ryan Fox

25. Leading PGA professionals
The top three players from the 2019 PGA Professional Player of the Year Standings:

Danny Balin
Marty Jertson
Ryan Vermeer

26. Leading amateur players
The top seven players, not otherwise exempt, from the August 19 World Amateur Golf Ranking:

Ricky Castillo (a)
Takumi Kanaya (a)
John Pak (a)
Eduard Rousaud (a)
Sandy Scott (a)
Davis Thompson (a)
Yu Chun-an (a)

27. Leading players from the Official World Golf Ranking
Remaining places in the field, as well as alternate positions, are allocated based on the August 23 Official World Golf Ranking:

Kevin Streelman (48th)
Harris English (53rd)
J. T. Poston (68th)
Joaquín Niemann (71st)
Thomas Pieters (73rd)
Max Homa (75th)
Lanto Griffin (78th)
Mike Lorenzo-Vera (79th)
Matthias Schwab (84th)
Alex Norén (87th)
Matt Jones (89th)

27.1 Alternates
Paul Waring (90th) – replaced Brooks KoepkaBranden Grace (91st) – replaced Scottie SchefflerRory Sabbatini (92nd) – replaced Sam Horsfield28. Special exemptions
Special exemptions given by the USGA:No players were given special exemptions.''

Notes

References

U.S. Open (golf)